Brentwood Rugby Football Club is an English rugby union club based in Brentwood, Essex. The first XV team currently plays in London 1 North, having been relegated from London & South East Premier at the end of the 2018–19 season.

Club honours
London 3 North East champions: 1992–93		
Essex Senior Cup winners: 2003
London 3 (north-east v north-west) promotion playoff winners: 2008–09
London 1 North champions 2017–18

See also
 Essex RFU

Notes

References

English rugby union teams
Rugby union clubs in Essex
Sports clubs in England
Brentwood (Essex town)